Hogtown is an unincorporated community in Whiskey Run Township, Crawford County, Indiana.

Geography

References

Unincorporated communities in Crawford County, Indiana
Unincorporated communities in Indiana